Constantin Secăreanu (born 11 January 1982) is a Romanian former footballer who played as a defender.

Honours
Sportul Studențesc București
Divizia B: 2000–01, 2003–04

References

External links
Constantin Secăreanu at Labtof.ro

1982 births
Living people
Romanian footballers
Association football defenders
Liga I players
Liga II players
FC Gloria Buzău players
FC Sportul Studențesc București players
People from Buzău